The 1987 All-Ireland Senior Club Camogie Championship for the leading clubs in the women's team field sport of camogie was won by St Paul’s from Kilkenny, who defeated Glen Rovers by two points in dreadful conditions in the final, played at Ballyragget.

Arrangements
The championship was organised on the traditional provincial system used in Gaelic Games since the 1880s, with Glenamaddy and Eglish winning the championships of the other two provinces.

The Final
The final was a low-scoring affair, played in torrential rain, icy wind and a surface that cut up badly. In the sixth minute of the second half. Ann Downey sent a free into the square that was only partially cleared and which was quickly returned to the unmarked Breda Holmes who palmed it to the net.

Final stages

References

External links
 Camogie Association

1987 in camogie
1987